Mionochroma rufescens is a species of beetle in the family Cerambycidae. It was described by Gahan in 1895. It is known from the West Indies and Mexico.

References

Cerambycinae
Beetles described in 1895